Maharashtra state in India is known for its Famous caves and cliffs. It is said that the varieties found in Maharashtra are wider than the caves and rock-cut architecture found in the rock cut areas of Egypt, Assyria, Persia and Greece. The Buddhist monks first started these caves in the 2nd century BC, in search of serene and peaceful environment for meditation, and they found these caves on the hillsides.

Buddhist and Hindu cave temples at Ellora and the Ajanta Caves contain fine artistic design elements and India's oldest wall paintings can be seen here. Maharashtra's famous rock-cut caves have several distinct artistic elements though sculptures of the time are regarded to modern viewers as stiff and not dynamic. The Buddhist caves, particularly the older ones, are either temples (Chaityas) or monasteries (Viharas).

Ancient

The oldest building in the state is Vakataka ruins in Mansar.

Rock cut caves

Rock-cut architecture took turn with the Buddhist reign and remarkable Buddhist monuments were produced in areas such as Bihar in the east and Maharashtra in the west. Natural grottos and caves in the hillside were excavated by the Buddhist monks and turned into glorious prayer halls and monasteries.

Ranging from tiny monastic cells to colossal, elaborately carved temples, they are remarkable for having been hewn by hand from solid rock. Their 3rd century BC origins seem to have been as temporary shelters for Buddhist monks when heavy monsoon rains made their normal itinerant lifestyle impossible.

Modeled on earlier wooden structures, most were sponsuoions sit like a sceptre and crown amidst hills turned mauve.

Medieval

Hindu 
During the early medieval period, the Maharashtrian region's architecture was largely based on a combination of old and new Nagara styles. Bhimashankar temple is considered to be a unique mix of these two Nagara styles. During the late period, Hemadri a court polymath of Yadavas of Deogiri used his unique combinational Nagara style to create many temples, which were again rebuilt due to numerous Islamic clashes and their penchant for destroying Hindu places of worship. Foremost among these are Trayambakeshwar Temple, Tulja Bhavani temple, Ghrishneshwar temple among others.

Indo-Islamic 

Some structures at the Daulatabad Fort is the earliest examples of Indo-Islamic architecture in Maharashtra. 

The medieval Ahmednagar Sultanate built the Ahmednagar Fort, Tomb of Salabat Khan II and Bagh Rauza in Ahmednagar. Their style is similar to that of the other Deccan Sultanates. 

The best example of Mughal architecture in Maharashtra is Bibi ka Maqbara built by Mughal Emperor Aurangzeb, which is a replica of the Taj Mahal.

Maratha 
The Maratha Empire ruled between the 17th and 19th centuries. They were constantly at war against the Mughal Empire. Therefore, several fortifications were built throughout the area, including Shaniwar Wada, Pratapgad, Raigad and Mangad. Shivaji built the Lal Mahal in Pune. During Confederacy era, many of the popular temples were built/revived all over Maharashtra. They reflect a peculiar architectural style regarded as Maratha Architecture.

Colonial

Portuguese 
During Portuguese rule in Mumbai, several fortifications, including the Madh Fort and Castella de Aguada were built in the city.

British Colonial 
During the British colonial era, European styles became prevalent, especially in Mumbai(Bombay at that time). The most significant examples are the two World Heritage sites of Mumbai ― Chhatrappati Shivaji terminus (designed by Frederick William Stevens in the gothic revival style), and the Victorian and Art Deco ensemble of Mumbai (consisting of Bombay High Court, Rajabai Clock Tower and University of Mumbai).  Other examples include and Municipal Corporation Building and Asiatic Society in Mumbai and Fergusson College of Pune.

Indo-Saracenic 
A new architectural style known as the Indo-Saracenic Revival Architecture developed, a combination of British and Indian styles. The best examples of this style are Gateway of India, Taj Mahal Hotel, Chhatrapati Shivaji Maharaj Vastu Sangrahalaya (formerly Prince of Wales Museum) in Mumbai.

Art Deco 

Mumbai has one of the largest collections of art deco buildings in the world.

Post-Independence (1947―present) 
Modern skyscrapers built in the international style such as The Imperial, Antilia, and Palais Royale form the skyline of Mumbai.

Gallery

Notes

References

Citations

Bibliography 

 

Maharashtra
Culture of Maharashtra